Tourtouse is a commune in the Ariège department and the administrative region of Occitania, France.

Population
Inhabitants of Tourtouse are known as the Tourtousains (feminine: Tourtousaines).

See also
Communes of the Ariège department

References

Communes of Ariège (department)